Jarne Van De Paar (born 23 October 2000) is a Belgian professional cyclist, who currently rides for UCI ProTeam . He is the 2022 Under-23 Belgian Road Race Champion. Just a few days after becoming a professional, he finished 3rd in the 2023 Trofeo Palma.

Major results
2017
 2nd Grand Prix Bati-Metallo
2018
 1st Young rider classification, SPIE Internationale Juniorendriedaagse
 4th Kuurne–Brussels–Kuurne Juniors
 6th Menen–Kemmel–Menen
 7th E3 Harelbeke Junioren
 9th Ronde van Vlaanderen Juniores
2019
 2nd Youngster Coast Challenge
 3rd De Kustpijl
2020
 4th Overall Tour Bitwa Warszawska 1920
2022
 1st  Road race, National Under-23 Road Championships
2023
 3rd Trofeo Palma

References

External links

2000 births
Living people
Belgian male cyclists
People from Balen
Cyclists from Antwerp Province